Kotn is a Canadian clothing retailer that sells both online and in their own retail stores in Toronto, Montreal, and Vancouver. During her time working at the luxury department store Holt Renfrew, Mackenzie Yeates noticed the lack of ethical options available to the wider market.  The business is based on the idea of providing middle market sustainable clothing. The company is headquartered in Toronto, Canada, and emphasizes its commitment to supply-chain transparency and give back initiatives. Kotn is a B Corp certified organization, scoring in the top 10 percent of B Corp organizations in the community impact category.

Awards 
In 2018, founders Benjamin Sehl, Mackenzie Yeates, and Rami Helali were included in Forbes' 30 Under 30 in the category "Retail & Ecommerce." 

In 2019, Kotn won the Canadian Arts and Fashion Awards Sustainability Award for the organization's work building schools for its farmers' children in Egypt.

References

External links
Official Website

Social enterprises
Companies based in Toronto
2010s fashion
Online clothing retailers of Canada
Canadian companies established in 2015
Retail companies established in 2015